Fusaea decurrens is a species of plant in the family Annonaceae. It is native to Peru. Robert Elias Fries. The Swedish botanist who first formally described the species, named it after wings of the leaves that run down ( in Latin) the stem of the leaf.

Description
It is a tree reaching 7 meters in height.  Its petioles are 5-6 millimeters long. Its mature leaves are hairless and densely covered in warty growths and shiny on their upper surfaces.  The oblong leaves are 18-22 by 4–6.5 centimeters and come to an abrupt 1.5 centimeter-long point at their tip.  The leaves narrow at their base to form long wings that run down the petioles. The leaves have 16-18 secondary veins emanating from both sides of their midribs. The secondary veins emerge at near 90° angles from the midribs, but curve to join one another 3-5 millimeters from the leaf margin. Its inflorescences have 2-3 green to yellow flowers. The flowers are on pedicels that are 1.5-2 millimeters long. The pedicels have a bract at their midpoint. Its round to oval sepals are warty on the outside, smooth on the inside, and 1.5 centimeters long. Its flowers have two rows of leathery petals. The petals are densely covered in silvery or rust-colored silky hairs on both surfaces. The outer petals are 2.5 by 1 centimeters. The inner petals are 3 by 1.3-1.7 centimeters. Its stamens are 2.7-3 millimeters long.

Reproductive biology
The pollen of F. decurrens is shed as permanent tetrads.

Habitat and distribution
It has been observed growing in forest habitats.

References

Annonaceae
Flora of Peru
Plants described in 1934
Taxa named by Robert Elias Fries